Events from the year 1632 in art.

Events
 July - Portraitist Anthony van Dyck, newly returned to London, is knighted and granted a pension as principalle Paynter in ordinary to their majesties.
 Construction of the Taj Mahal mausoleum begins at Agra in India, probably to a design by Ustad Ahmad Lahauri. It will continue until 1653.

Works

Rembrandt
The Anatomy Lesson of Dr. Nicolaes Tulp
Jacob de Gheyn
Maurits Huygens
Philosopher in Meditation (or Interior with Tobit and Anna)
Nicholas Stone - Monument to Heneage Finch
Jusepe de Ribera 
Ixion
The Blind Sculptor
Sir Anthony van Dyck 
Queen Henrietta Maria
Thetis Receiving the Weapons of Achilles from Hephaestus
Diego Velázquez
Christ Crucified
Temptation of St. Thomas

Births
January 11 - Adam Frans van der Meulen, Flemish Baroque painter specializing in battle scenes (died 1690)
May 13 - Nicolas Pitau, Flemish engraver and printmaker (died 1671)
August 8 - Johann Carl Loth, German painter active in Venice (died 1698)
September 12 bapt. - Claude Lefèbvre, French painter and engraver (died 1675)
October 31 - Johannes Vermeer, Dutch painter (died 1675)
date unknown
Giacomo Alboresi, Italian painter (died 1677)
Hendrik Bary, Dutch engraver (died 1707)
Antoine Benoist, French painter and sculptor (died 1717)
Bartolomeo Biscaino, Italian painter, active in his native Genoa (died 1657)
Jean-Gilles Delcour, Flemish religious painter (died 1695)
Enkū, Japanese Buddhist monk and sculptor during the early Edo period (died 1695)
Wang Hui, Chinese landscape painter, the best known of the Four Wangs (died 1717)
Frederick Kerseboom, German painter (died 1690)
Giovanni Battista Merano, Italian painter of frescoes, mainly active in his native Genoa (died unknown)
Hendrik van Minderhout, Dutch seascape painter (died 1696)
Jan Wijnants, Dutch painter (died 1684)
probable
 Wu Li, Chinese landscape painter and poet during the Qing Dynasty (died 1718)
Wang Wu, Chinese painter and poet during the Qing Dynasty (died 1690)

Deaths
January - Abraham Janssens, Flemish painter (born 1567-1576)
January 29 - Jan Porcellis, Dutch marine artist (born 1583/1585)
July 17 - Hendrick van Balen, Flemish painter, who was born and died in Antwerp (born 1575)
August 19 - Valentin de Boulogne, French painter (born 1591)
October 23 - Giovanni Battista Crespi, Italian painter, sculptor, and architect (born 1573)
date unknown
Francisco Salmerón, Spanish painter (born 1608)
Barend van Someren, Dutch Golden Age painter (born 1572)
probable
Carlo Bononi, Italian painter of the School of Ferrara (born 1569)
Domenico Falcini, Flemish Renaissance painter and engraver (born 1575)
(died 1632/1633) Tanzio da Varallo, Italian painter of the late-Mannerist or early Baroque period (born 1575/1580)
David Vinckboons, Dutch painter of Flemish origin (born 1576)

 
Years of the 17th century in art
1630s in art